Francisco Miguel Duarte, also known by the nickname Chico Sapateiro (18 December 1907 – 21 May 1988) was a Portuguese writer and a regional leader in the Portuguese Communist Party. He was a poet, whose principal subjects are revolution and the Portuguese people. Among his best known works is a poem in honor of the memory of Catarina Eufémia, his fellow countrywoman, since the author, like Eufémia, was a native of Baleizão, a village near Beja in the south of Portugal. He is also known for his book Das Prisões à Liberdade.

Imprisonment
He was the leader of the regional committee of the Portuguese Communist Party in Algarve. His imprisonment in 1947 seriously weakened that provincial organization. He was the last political prisoner, remaining alone for six months, in the concentration camp of Tarrafal - the penal colony of Cape Verde - before being transferred, again, to Lisbon on January 26, 1954, where he was imprisoned first in Aljube and then in Caxias prison.

Election
He was elected a member of the Portuguese parliament by the constituency of Beja in the election of April 25, 1975, the first free election after 48 years of dictatorship.

See also 

 Armed Revolutionary Action

External links
(In Portuguese)
A report in Avante! about the peasant struggle in Alentejo
The presence of Duarte in Tarrafal
The shoemakers and the opposition to the Estado Novo regime
Brief biography of Francisco Miguel Duarte 

Portuguese Communist Party politicians
1907 births
1988 deaths
Portuguese prisoners and detainees
Prisoners and detainees of Portugal
Members of the Assembly of the Republic (Portugal)